The Battle of Mesamávida was a Royalist victory during the Guerra a muerte campaign of the Chilean War of Independence. It was fought on 23 February 1819.

1819 in Chile
Battles involving Chile
Battles involving Spain
Battles involving the Mapuche
Conflicts in 1819
Mesa
Battles of the Chilean War of Independence
Battles of the Total War Campaign
February 1819 events